Nélida Bilbao (1918 – August 1990) was an Argentine film actress. She appeared in twenty-six films between 1938 and 1963.

Filmography

 Women Who Work (1938)
 Jettatore (1938)
 Mi suegra es una fiera (1939)
 Divorce in Montevideo (1939)
 A Thief Has Arrived (1940)
 The Tango Star (1940)
 Mi fortuna por un nieto (1940)
 Sweethearts for the Girls (1941)
 The Unhappiest Man in Town (1941)
 Pueblo chico, infierno grande (1941)
 Story of a Poor Young Man (1942)
 I Knew That Woman(1942)
 Little Teacher of Workmen (1942)
 Incertidumbre  (1942)
 La juventud manda (1943)
 Dark Valley (1943)
 An Evening of Love (1943)
 The Corpse Breaks a Date (1944)
 La verdadera victoria (1945)
 The Cat (1947)
 ¿Vendrás a media noche? (1950)
 Derecho viejo (1951)
 Un guapo del 900 (1952)
 News in Hell (1959)
 Las modelos (1963)
 Aquellos que fueron (TV Mini Series, 3 episodes, 1973)

 References 

 Bibliography 
 Richard, Alfred . Censorship and Hollywood's Hispanic image: an interpretive filmography, 1936-1955''. Greenwood Press, 1993.

External links 

 

1918 births
1990 deaths
Actresses from Buenos Aires
Argentine film actresses
20th-century Argentine actresses